Danevirke Museum is a museum located a few kilometers just outside the city of Schleswig, Schleswig-Holstein, and the text inside the museum is written in both Danish and German. It opened in 1990 and focuses on the history of Dannewerk from the Viking Age to the present, including an archaeological park.

References

External links

  

Museums in Schleswig-Holstein
Schleswig, Schleswig-Holstein
Danish minority of Southern Schleswig